Events from the year 1533 in art.

Events

Works

Bronzino - "Portrait of a Young Man as Saint Sebastian"
Hans Holbein the Younger
The Ambassadors
Thomas Cromwell (Frick Collection)
Titian
Penitent Magdalene
Portrait of Charles V with a Dog (copy)
Portrait of Ippolito de' Medici

Births
 Giovanni Battista da Ponte, Italian painter active in Venice and his native Bassano del Grappa (died 1613)
 Sadiqi Beg, Persian poet, biographer, draftsman, soldier and miniaturist of the Safavid dynasty period (died 1610)
 Joachim Beuckelaer, Flemish painter primarily of scenes of kitchen and markets (died 1574)
 Cornelis Cort,  Dutch engraver and draughtsman (died 1578)
 Giovanni Antonio Dosio, Italian architect and sculptor (died 1609)
 Sun Kehong, Chinese landscape painter, calligrapher, and poet (died 1611)
 Jacques Le Moyne de Morgues, French artist and member of Jean Ribault's expedition to the New World (died 1588)
 Pompeo Leoni, Italian sculptor and medallist (died 1608)

Deaths
August 8 - Lucas van Leyden, Dutch engraver and painter (born 1494)
September - Veit Stoss, German engraver, painter, and sculptor (born 1445/1450)
date unknown
Jacob Cornelisz van Oostsanen, Northern Netherlandish designer of woodcuts and painter (born 1470)
Girolamo del Pacchia, Italian painter (born 1477)

References

 
Years of the 16th century in art